The 2013 season was the San Francisco 49ers' 64th in the National Football League (NFL), 68th overall and third under the head coach/general manager tandem of Jim Harbaugh and Trent Baalke. This marked the first season since 2004 that quarterback Alex Smith was not on the roster as he joined the Kansas City Chiefs. This was the 49ers' final season playing their home games at Candlestick Park before moving into Levi's Stadium for the 2014 season.

The 49ers entered the season as the defending NFC champions, qualified for the playoffs as the fifth seed Wild Card, and hoped to win a sixth Super Bowl title, after falling just short during the previous season. The 49ers' defeated the Green Bay Packers 23–20 in the Wild Card round and the Carolina Panthers 23–10 in the Divisional round, but lost to the Seattle Seahawks in the NFC Championship by a score of 17–23, failing to join the 1985 New England Patriots, 2005 Pittsburgh Steelers, 2007 New York Giants, and 2010 Green Bay Packers as the only teams to win 3 straight road games in the playoffs. The playoff loss also tied an NFL record for most losses with a Super Bowl berth at stake with nine (first set by the 2000 Oakland Raiders).

The 2013 season was the last season in which the San Francisco 49ers qualified for the playoffs or had a winning season until 2019.

2013 NFL draft

Notes
 The team acquired an additional second-round selection (No. 34 overall) along with a 2014 second-round selection (originally conditional) in a trade that sent quarterback Alex Smith to the Kansas City Chiefs.
 The team acquired an additional third-round selection (No. 74 overall) as part of a trade that sent a 2012 fourth-round selection to the Carolina Panthers.
 The team acquired an additional fifth-round selection (No. 157 overall) as part of a trade that sent a 2012 third-round selection to the Indianapolis Colts.
 The team traded a fifth-round selection (No. 164 overall) and seventh-round selection (No. 227 overall) to the Cleveland Browns for quarterback Colt McCoy and a sixth-round selection (No. 173 overall).
 The team acquired an additional sixth-round selection (No. 180 overall) as part of a trade that sent a 2012 fourth-round selection to the Miami Dolphins.
 The team traded their sixth-round selection (No. 199 overall) to the Baltimore Ravens for wide receiver Anquan Boldin.
 The team acquired an additional seventh-round selection (No. 227 overall) in a trade that sent safety Taylor Mays to the Cincinnati Bengals.
 The team traded their first-round selection (No. 31) and one of their third-round selections (No. 74 overall) to the Dallas Cowboys for a first-round selection (No. 18).
 The team traded one of their second-round selections (No. 34 overall) to the Tennessee Titans for a second-round selection (No. 40 overall), a seventh-round selection (No. 216 overall), and a 2014 third-round selection.
 The team traded a second-round selection (No. 61 overall) and sixth-round selection (No. 173 overall) to the Green Bay Packers for a second-round selection (No. 55 overall).
 The team traded a third-round selection (No. 93 overall) and seventh-round selection (No. 216 overall) to the Green Bay Packers for a third-round selection (No. 88 overall).

Staff

Final roster

Preseason

Regular season

Schedule

Game summaries

Week 1: vs. Green Bay Packers

Colin Kaepernick set a career-high with 412 yards passing and three touchdowns, the first 400-yard passing game by a 49ers quarterback since Tim Rattay on October 10, 2004, as well as the first 400-yard, three-touchdown passing game since Jeff Garcia in 1999. Anquan Boldin, making his debut as a 49er, racked up 208 yards receiving on 13 receptions, and scored a touchdown. Vernon Davis had 6 receptions for 98 yards and two touchdowns.

Week 2: at Seattle Seahawks

Seattle comfortably beat the 49ers for the second consecutive season at home, with the Seahawks defense proving far too strong.

Week 3: vs. Indianapolis Colts

The 49ers were heavily beaten for the second straight week to fall to a 1–2 record. The Colts' running game and defensive strength proved too strong in Kaepernick's first home defeat as a starter.

Week 4: at St. Louis Rams

The 49ers season got back on track with a heavy Thursday Night Football victory over divisional opponent St Louis. Both the passing and running offense were effective in the victory, a positive sign of things to come, while the defense was its usual strong.

Week 5: vs. Houston Texans

Another large victory gave the 49ers their first back-to-back victories of the season. Quarterback Colin Kaepernick only completed 6 of his 15 passes, with the running attack and defense at the top of their games. Frank Gore and Anthony Dixon ran for touchdowns, while cornerback Tramaine Brock picked off two Matt Schaub passes, one for a touchdown on Schaub's first pass of the game, with Tony Jerod-Eddie also picking up an interception. The 49ers improved to 3–2, just one game off the 4–1 Seattle Seahawks in the battle for NFC West, who had lost to the Indianapolis Colts.

Week 6: vs. Arizona Cardinals

A third straight win for the 49ers as the offense and defense sparked. Colin Kaepernick had 252 yards for two touchdowns, both to Vernon Davis, Frank Gore ran for 101 yards, and the defense forced four turnovers for the second consecutive game.

Week 7: at Tennessee Titans
{{Americanfootballbox
 |titlestyle=;text-align:center;
 |state=autocollapse
 |title=Week Seven: San Francisco 49ers at Tennessee Titans – Game summary
 |date=October 20
 |time=3:05 pm. CDT/1:05 pm. PDT
 |road=49ers
 |R1=3|R2=14|R3=7|R4=7
 |home=Titans
 |H1=0|H2=0|H3=0|H4=17
 |stadium=LP Field, Nashville, Tennessee
 |attendance=69,143
 |weather=, sunny
 |referee=Ron Winter
 |TV=Fox
 |TVAnnouncers=Chris Myers, Tim Ryan and Jennifer Hale
 |reference=Recap, Game book
 |scoring=
First quarter
 SF – Phil Dawson 44-yard field goal, 5:19. 49ers 3–0. Drive: 12 plays, 65 yards, 6:34.
Second quarter
 SF – Colin Kaepernick 20-yard run (Phil Dawson kick), 6:42. 49ers 10–0. Drive: 8 plays, 80 yards, 4:46.
 SF – Frank Gore 1-yard run (Phil Dawson kick), 2:07. 49ers 17–0. Drive: 6 plays, 45 yards, 3:02.
Third quarter
 SF – Frank Gore 1-yard run (Phil Dawson kick), 7:20. 49ers 24–0. Drive: 12 plays, 79 yards, 7:40.
Fourth quarter
 TEN – Rob Bironas 31-yard field goal, 12:23. 49ers 24–3. Drive: 11 plays, 67 yards, 3:43. TEN – Chris Johnson 66-yard pass from Jake Locker (Rob Bironas kick), 7:07. 49ers 24–10. Drive: 2 plays, 86 yards, 0:35.
 SF – Kassim Osgood fumble recovery in the end zone (Phil Dawson kick), 6:16. 49ers 31–10.
 TEN – Delanie Walker 26-yard pass from Jake Locker (Rob Bironas kick), 3:17. 49ers 31–17. Drive: 10 plays, 58 yards, 2:59.
 |stats=Top passers SF – Colin Kaepernick – 13/21, 199 yards
 TEN – Jake Locker – 25/41, 326 yards, 2 TD, INTTop rushers SF – Frank Gore – 24 rushes, 70 yards, 2 TD
 TEN – Chris Johnson – 9 rushes, 39 yardsTop receivers SF – Anquan Boldin – 5 receptions, 74 yards
 TEN – Kendall Wright – 9 receptions, 98 yards
}}

The 49ers cruised to a fourth consecutive win thanks to a strong running game, with Frank Gore picking up 70 yards for 2 touchdowns and Colin Kaepernick 68 yards for 1 touchdown. The final scoreline was flattering for the young Titans, who fell to a 24–0 deficit at the end of the third quarter. A muffed punt for a touchdown for Kassim Osgood was also a highlight for the 49ers.

Week 8: at Jacksonville JaguarsNFL International SeriesFrank Gore and Colin Kaepernick each ran for two touchdowns in the 49ers comfortable victory over the 0–7 Jaguars at Wembley Stadium in London, the eighth NFL match the venue has hosted, to improve to 6–2.

Week 10: vs. Carolina Panthers

After five straight victories, the 49ers dropped another home match following their bye. The Panthers' defense was too strong, limiting Colin Kaepernick to 91 yards and an interception as the 49ers could only score three field goals. The mid-game loss of tight end Vernon Davis and safety Eric Reid to concussions did not aid the 49ers cause as they fell to 6–3.

Week 11: at New Orleans Saints

Another set of back-to-back losses came in controversial circumstance for the 49ers that saw the team slip to 6–4. The 49ers led 20–17 with less than five minutes to go in the final quarter, before two Garrett Hartley field goals won it for the Saints, the second as time expired. On the drive leading to the first or these field goals, linebacker Ahmad Brooks was flagged for a contentious personal foul on Drew Brees for a blow to the neck on a sack and fumble, leading to a 15-yard penalty. Colin Kaepernick's three and out between the field goals also was a major contributor to the Saints' victory.

Week 12: at Washington Redskins

The 49ers got back to winning ways with a comfortable victory in Washington. Colin Kaepernick hit form with 235 yards and 3 touchdowns, while Redskins' quarterback Robert Griffin III threw just 118 yards and an interception in addition to being sacked 4 times, in a match-up between what are widely considered two of the league's best young quarterbacks. The 49ers improved to 7–4 as they looked to seal a playoff spot and pressure Seattle for the NFC West crown.

Week 13: vs. St. Louis Rams

The 49ers defeated the Rams for the second time this season on the back of strong performances from the passing offense. Colin Kaepernick threw for 275 yards and a touchdown, Anquan Boldin caught nine passes for 98 yards, Michael Crabtree caught a 60-yard pass in his first game for six months following an achilles injury, and Vernon Davis athletically hurdled his way over a defender on two separate occasions for 82 yards and a touchdown, the 49ers improving to 8–4.

Week 14: vs. Seattle Seahawks

Seeking to avenge their week 2 loss in Seattle, the 49ers defense held Seahawks quarter back Russell Wilson and running back Marshawn Lynch to 199 passing yards and 72 rushing yards respectively. 4 field goals from kicker Phil Dawson, an 8-yard touchdown pass to tight end Vernon Davis, and a 51-yard run by running back Frank Gore in the fourth quarter lifted the 49ers to a 19–17 victory and improved their record to 9–4. The win also continued the Seahawks' losing streak at Candlestick Park since 2008. This would not be the last time these two teams would meet as they met again in the 2013 NFC Championship game. This was the 49ers' last win over the Seahawks until 2018.

Week 15: at Tampa Bay Buccaneers

The 10th win of the season and fourth consecutive win came easily as the 49ers looked to clinch a playoff spot. Vernon Davis caught a touchdown for the fifth consecutive game and Michael Crabtree caught his first touchdown since returning from injury, as Colin Kaepernick threw for 203 yards and two touchdowns.

Week 16: vs. Atlanta Falcons

The 49ers played their final game at Candlestick Park on Monday Night Football against the Atlanta Falcons. Their 34–24 victory came after an interception by NaVorro Bowman with 1:28 left in the game. The play would seal a win for a playoff spot for the 49ers and is called The Pick at the Stick''' by some sports columnists. This game was also Candlestick Park's 36th and final game on Monday Night Football'', the most at any stadium used by the NFL.

Week 17: at Arizona Cardinals
 

Phil Dawson kicked a 40-yard field goal as time expired to lock up the 5th seed for the 49ers. The 49ers started on fire, leading 17–0 after the first quarter, with the Cardinals showing courage and determination in their fightback, squaring the game at 20–20 before LaMichael James' 45-yard kickoff return and two quick completions by Colin Kaepernick set up Dawson's game winner. Anquan Boldin was very impressive, catching nine passes for 149 yards and a touchdown in his first game back in Arizona after the Cardinals traded him to Baltimore prior to the 2010 season. The 49ers finished the season with an impressive 12–4 record, half a win better than the previous season, to give them second place in NFC West and the 5th seed in the playoffs (the 49ers won the NFC West and had the #2 seed in 2012), securing them a trip to Green Bay in the Wild Card Round.

Standings

Division

Conference

Postseason

Schedule

Game summaries

NFC Wild Card Round: at Green Bay Packers

In one of the coldest games in NFL playoff history, Colin Kaepernick threw for 227 yards and ran for a game-high 98 as the 49ers beat the Packers 23–20. The Packers tied the game at 20 with a field goal with 5:06 left, but Kaepernick led the 49ers down the field to set up a game-winning 33-yard field goal by Phil Dawson as time expired. The 49ers are now 4–0 against Green Bay in the last two years, after going 1–11 against them (including playoffs) from 1995 to 2010. This was also the first time ever the 49ers won at Green Bay in the playoffs.

NFC Divisional Round: at Carolina Panthers

The 49ers advanced to their third consecutive NFC Championship game by beating a red hot Carolina Panthers team, 23–10. Coming into the game, the Panthers had won eleven of their last twelve games and finished the season ranked number two in total defense. This game was a rematch from week 10, with the Panthers winning 10–9. This time though, it was the 49ers who would come out victorious. Two key goal line stands by the 49ers defense in the second quarter (including a stop on fourth-and-goal at the 1-yard line) were the major difference in the game. The 49ers defense shut the Panthers out in the second half with constant pressure on Cam Newton, sacking him twice and intercepting a pass late in the fourth quarter that shut down any chance Carolina had at a comeback. Colin Kaepernick went 15 for 28 for 196 yards and a touchdown, while Anquan Boldin had 8 catches for 136 yards. The 23 points by the 49ers were the most points the Panthers allowed at home this year. The 49ers then headed to Seattle.

NFC Championship Game: at Seattle Seahawks

Though the 49ers led 10–3 at halftime, the Seahawks came back and then survived a late 49ers comeback attempt. With Seattle leading 20–17 in the fourth quarter, Colin Kaepernick attempted to rally his team, but fumbled once and threw two interceptions in the final three 49ers possessions of the game. Seahawks outscored San Francisco 20–7 in the second half. In the fourth quarter, NaVorro Bowman suffered a major knee injury on a tackle and forced fumble near the goal line; his recovery of the ensuing fumble was not seen by the officials (and the league later agreed that the officials had missed the call); the 49ers forced another fumble on the next play and recovered it, but they could not take advantage. In the last minute of play, Kaepernick again had the 49ers in position to try for a win, but his pass to Michael Crabtree in the end zone was deflected by Richard Sherman and intercepted by Malcolm Smith, clinching the win for Seattle. The contest between the two elite defenses led many to consider the game a quasi-Super Bowl, as popular opinion was that the 49ers and Seahawks were the two best teams in the NFL. This opinion was only cemented further after the Seahawks defeated the Denver Broncos 43–8 in the Super Bowl.

References

External links
 
 

San Francisco
San Francisco 49ers seasons
2013 in San Francisco
San